The  is an electric multiple unit (EMU) train type operated by Central Japan Railway Company (JR Central) on mid-distance limited express and Homeliner services in Japan since October 1995.

Design
The trains were built jointly by Hitachi and Nippon Sharyo.

Operations
As of 2011, the 373 series sets are used on the following services.
 Wide View Fujikawa ( – ) (since 1 October 1995)
 Wide View Inaji ( – ) (since 16 March 1996)
 Home Liner Numazu
 Home Liner Hamamatsu
 Home Liner Shizuoka

Formation
The 3-car sets, numbered F1 to F14, are formed as follows.

The KuMoHa 373 car is fitted with one C-PS27G single-arm pantograph.

Interior
The 3-car sets are single class with rotating/reclining 2+2 seating arranged with a seat pitch of 970 mm. The KuMoHa 373 and SaHa 373 cars have fixed 4-seat "semi-compartment" bays at the ends of the cars with large tables.

History
The first sets were delivered from Nippon Sharyo in August 1995, entering revenue service from 1 October 1995 on Wide View Fujikawa services.

From 18 March 2007, all cars were made no-smoking.

References

External links

 JR Central 373 series information 

Electric multiple units of Japan
Central Japan Railway Company
Train-related introductions in 1995
Hitachi multiple units
Nippon Sharyo multiple units
1500 V DC multiple units of Japan